James Atoe (born October 1, 1991) is an American football offensive lineman who is currently a free agent. He played college football at University of Washington and attended The Dalles High School in The Dalles, Oregon. He has also been a member of the Colorado Crush and the Spokane Empire.

College career
Atoe played for the Washington Huskies from 2010 to 2014. He was the team's starter his final year and helped the Huskies to 31 wins. He played in 43 games during his career including 13 starts at guard and 7 at tackle.

College statistics

Professional career

Atoe was invited to the Seattle Seahawks rookie mini-camp as an undrafted free agent, but was not offered a contract. After being cut by the Seahawks, Atoe was invited to play for the United States national American football team. Atoe helped the United States win the 2015 IFAF World Championship, and was named to the All-Tournament team.

Colorado Crush
Atoe signed with the Colorado Crush in January, 2016. He was named Second Team All-IFL following the season.

Spokane Empire
On October 4, 2016, Atoe signed with the Spokane Empire. On January 24, 2017, the Empire placed Atoe on the transfer list.

Washington Valor
Atoe was assigned to the Washington Valor on January 17, 2017.

References

External links
Washington Huskies profile

Living people
1991 births
American football offensive linemen
Washington Huskies football players
Colorado Crush (IFL) players
Spokane Empire players
Washington Valor players